Berndt Ekholm, born 1944, is a Swedish social democratic politician, member of the Riksdag 1985–2006.

References

Members of the Riksdag from the Social Democrats
Living people
1944 births
Members of the Riksdag 2002–2006
Swedish Christian socialists
Members of the Riksdag 1985–1988
Members of the Riksdag 1988–1991
Members of the Riksdag 1991–1994
Members of the Riksdag 1994–1998
Members of the Riksdag 1998–2002